Midlands Radio plc was an independent radio operator, which operated seven radio licences in Birmingham, Coventry, Leicester, Nottingham and surrounding areas in the United Kingdom.

Stations owned

FM
BRMB
Leicester Sound
Radio Trent
Mercia Sound

AM
GEM AM - operated on the medium wave frequencies of Radio Trent.
Xtra AM - operated on the medium wave frequencies of BRMB and Mercia.

History

Under the control of Ron Coles, Midlands Radio plc was floated on the full stock market in 1990.
 
Following the introduction of the Broadcasting Act of 1990, a number of major groups began to lead a consolidation of the market. This led to Midlands Radio plc being purchased by for 18 million by Capital Radio plc, who then sold Trent, Leicester Sound, and Mercia Sound to GWR in 1993, but kept hold of BRMB.

As Mercia and its medium wave frequency were sold in the bundle, GWR announced that 1359 kHz would be rebranded as Classic Gold. This meant Xtra AM would only continue in Birmingham, and due to the presenters urging Coventry listeners to retune to the Birmingham frequency GWR pulled the plug on Xtra AM in Coventry earlier than provisionally agreed.

Under the new ownership, the FM stations were re-launched under GWR's Better Music Mix uniformed format. GEM continued to be live and local 24 hours a day until in 1997, when Tony Lyman's programme was networked from 12 midday - 3 p.m. across most of the Midlands and the Home Counties on the Classic Gold network, at this point the name of the station was changed to Classic Gold GEM. More and more shared programming began to creep in and the name GEM finally died on Friday 3 August 2007 at 7.00 p.m., when Classic Gold GEM became part of the Gold Network, following the merger of Classic Gold and Capital Gold. The only remaining local programme (12-4pm weekdays) is pre recorded.

GWR later merged with Capital Radio to form GCAP Media, this led to the stations giving less and less commitment to the areas they served and often sharing programmes from other bases. GCAP was then acquired by the Global Radio empire based in Leicester Square, London. Now all stations have lost their heritage names and are simply known as Heart with only 2 local programmes during weekdays.

References

External links
Details of principal subsidiaries of GCAP Media
History of Trent FM (including ownership)
History of commercial radio in Derbyshire
 History of commercial radio in Warwickshire
History of commercial radio in Nottinghamshire
History of commercial radio in Leicestershire

Former British radio networks
Radio broadcasting companies of the United Kingdom
Radio stations in Leicestershire
Radio stations in Birmingham, West Midlands
Mass media in the East Midlands
Radio stations in Derbyshire